The discography of Armor for Sleep, an American rock band, consists of four studio albums, two extended play and eight singles.

Studio albums

Extended plays

Singles

Other appearances

Unreleased songs

Videography

Music videos

Video albums

References

Discographies of American artists